The following outline is provided as an overview of and topical guide to history:

History – discovery, collection, organization, and presentation of information about past events. History can also mean the period of time after writing was invented (the beginning of recorded history).

Nature of history 
History can be described as all of the following:
 Academic discipline – body of knowledge given to – or received by – a disciple (student); a branch or sphere of knowledge, or field of study, that an individual has chosen to specialise in.
 one of the humanities – academic discipline that study the human condition, using methods that are primarily analytical, critical, or speculative, as distinguished from the mainly empirical approaches of the natural sciences.
 Field of science  – widely recognized category of specialized expertise within science, and typically embodies its own terminology and nomenclature.  Such a field will usually be represented by one or more scientific journals, where peer reviewed research is published.  There are many sociology-related scientific journals.
 Social science  – field of academic scholarship that explores aspects of human society.

Essence of history
 Chronology – science of arranging events in their order of occurrence in time, such as in historical timelines.
 Past – totality of events which occurred before a given point in time. The past is contrasted with and defined by the present and the future. The concept of the past is derived from the linear fashion in which human observers experience time, and is accessed through memory and recollection. The past is the domain of history.
 Time – measure in which events can be ordered from the past through the present into the future, and also the measure of durations of events and the intervals between them. Time is often referred to as the fourth dimension, along with the three spatial dimensions. History describes what happened where, but also when (in time) those events took place.

Historical disciplines 
 Archaeology – study of past human cultures through the recovery, documentation and analysis of material remains and environmental data
 Archontology – study of historical offices and important positions in state, international, political, religious and other organizations and societies
 Art history – study of changes in and social context of art
 Chronology – locating events in time
 Cultural history – study of culture in the past
 Diplomatic history – study of the historical foreign policy and diplomacy of states 
 History of science – study of the emergence and development of scientific inquiry
 Economic history – the study of economics in the past
 Environmental history – study of natural history and the human relationship with the natural world
 Futurology – study of the future: researches the medium to long-term future of societies and of the physical world
 Historiography – both the study of the methodology of historians and development of history as a discipline, and also to a body of historical work on a particular subject. The historiography of a specific topic covers how historians have studied that topic using particular sources, techniques, and theoretical approaches.
 History painting – painting of works of art having historical motifs or depicting great events
 Intellectual history
 Local history – study of history in a geographically local context
 Military history – study of warfare and wars in history
 Naval history – branch of military history devoted to warfare at sea or in bodies of water
 Paleography – study of ancient texts
 Philosophy of history – philosophical study of history and its discipline.
 Political history – study of past political events, ideas, movements, and leaders
 Public history – presentation of history to public audiences and other areas typically outside academia
 Psychohistory – study of the psychological motivations of historical events
 Social history – study of societies and social trends in the past
 Universal history – study of trends and dynamics in world history
 Urban history – historical nature of cities and towns, and the process of urbanization
 Women's history – study of the roles of women throughout history 
 World history – study of global or transnational historical patterns

Auxiliary sciences of history 

Auxiliary sciences of history – scholarly disciplines which help evaluate and use historical sources and are seen as auxiliary for historical research. Auxiliary sciences of history include, but are not limited to:

 Archeology – study of ancient and historic sites and artifacts 
 Chronology – study of the sequence of past events
 Cliometrics – systematic application of economic theory, econometric techniques, and other formal or mathematical methods to the study of history
 Codicology – study of books as physical objects
 Diplomatics – study and textual analysis of historical documents
 Epigraphy – study of ancient inscriptions
 Faleristics – study of military orders, decorations and medals
 Genealogy – study of family relationships
 Heraldry – study of armorial devices
 Numismatics – study of coins 
 Onomastics – study of proper names 
 Paleography – study of old handwriting
 Philately – study of postage stamps
 Philology – study of the language of historical sources
 Prosopography – investigation of a historical group of individuals through a collective study of their lives
 Radiocarbon dating – assignation of dates to artefacts from the distant past
 Sigillography – study of seals
 Statistics – study of the collection, organization, and interpretation of (historical) data
 Toponymy – study of place-names

History by period 

History by period
 History of Earth
 Human history
 News

History by chronology

 Chronology of the Universe
 Formation and evolution of the Solar System
 Geological history of Earth
 Evolutionary history of life
 Human history
 Universal history
 Ancient history
 Prehistory
 Classical antiquity
 Post-classical history
 Modern history
 Early modern period
 Late modern period
 Contemporary history
 Pre-Columbian
 Mesoamerican chronology
 Renaissance
 Future history

Ages of history

Prehistoric Ages
 Stone Age
 Paleolithic
 Lower Paleolithic – (Homo, Stone tools, spread of Homo Erectus to Eurasia, control of fire, and later spears, pigments, constructed shelter)
 Middle Paleolithic – (Recent African origin of modern humans, Homo sapiens, Homo neanderthalensis; clothing, beads, burial, bedding, bone tools)
 Upper Paleolithic – (behavioral modernity, atlatl, domestication of dogs)
 Mesolithic – (microliths, bow, canoes)
 Neolithic – (domestication, nomadic pastoralism, agriculture, proto-cities)
 Stone Age Levant
 Tell Halaf
 Ubaid period
 Neolithic Europe – (Linear Pottery, Vinča culture)
 Neolithic China
 Neolithic South Asia
 Mehrgarh
 Paleo-Indians (Americas)
 Chalcolithic (Copper Age) – (Yamna culture, Corded Ware)
 Uruk period
 Europe – (Metallurgy in pre-Columbian Mesoamerica)

Historic Ages
 Ancient Age
 Bronze Age
 Iron Age
 Postclassical Age (Middle Ages)
 Early Middle Ages
 High Middle Ages
 Late Middle Ages
 Modern Age
 Early modern Age
 Late Modern Age
 Contemporary Age

Other Ages
 Axial Age
 Dark Age
 Viking Age
 Age of Discovery
 Age of Reason
 Age of Enlightenment
 Industrial Age
 Atomic Age
 Information Age
 Space Age

Regional histories 

Regional history
 Ancient Egypt
 Babylonia
 India
 Classics
 Ancient Greece
 Ancient Rome
 Ancient China
 Mesoamerica

History by continent and country
 Timeline of country and capital changes since 1001 CE
 Timeline of ancient country changes before 1001 CE

Economic history by region

Military history by region

Eras by region

Era
 Chinese Eras
 Japanese Eras
 Korean Eras
 Vietnamese Eras

History by field

History of art

 History of art
 History of the performing arts
 History of dance
 History of film
 History of music
 History of opera
 History of theatre
 History of visual arts
 History of architecture (timeline)
 History of design
 History of drawing
 History of film
 History of painting
 History of photography
 History of sculpture

History of culture

 Cultural history
 History of archaeology (timeline)
 History of banking
 History of cooking
 History of games
 History of chess
 History of literature
 History of money
 History of poetry
 History of sport

History of mathematics

 History of mathematics (timeline)
 History of algebra
 History of arithmetic
 History of calculus
 History of geometry
 History of trigonometry
 History of logic
 History of statistics

History of philosophy

 History of philosophy (timeline)
 History of ethics
 History of normative ethics
 History of meta-ethics
 History of humanism
 History of logic
 History of metaphysics
 History of transhumanism
 History of Western philosophy

History of religions
 History of religions (timeline)
 Axial Age
 Evolutionary origin of religions
 The Bible and history
 History of Buddhism (timeline)
 History of Christianity (timeline)
 Historical Jesus
 History of the Catholic Church
 History of Protestantism
 History of the Puritans
 History of creationism
 History of Hinduism
 History of Islam (timeline)
 History of Judaism
 History of Taoism
 History of Wicca

History of science

 History of science
 History of science in general
 History of scientific method
 Theories/sociology of science
 Historiography
 History of pseudoscience
 By era
 History of science in early cultures
 History of science in Classical Antiquity
 History of science in the Middle Ages
 History of science in the Renaissance
 Scientific revolution
 History of natural science
 History of biology
 History of biochemistry
 History of physical science
 History of nature
 History of astronomy (timeline)
 History of chemistry
 History of ecology
 History of geography
 History of geology (timeline)
 History of meteorology (timeline)
 History of oceanography
 History of physics

History of social sciences

 History of the social sciences
 Business history
 Historiography
 History of anthropology
 History of archaeology (timeline)
 History of criminal justice
 History of economic thought
 History of education
 History of geography
 History of linguistics
 History of management
 History of marketing
 History of political science
 History of psychology (timeline)
 History of science and technology
 History of scientific method
 History of sociology (timeline)
 Legal history (history of law)

History of technology

 History of technology
 Aviation history
 History of agricultural science
 History of agriculture
 History of architecture (timeline)
 History of artificial intelligence
 History of biotechnology
 History of cartography
 History of communication
 History of computer science
 History of programming languages (timeline)
 History of software engineering
 History of electromagnetism
 History of engineering
 History of chemical engineering
 History of electrical engineering
 History of materials science
 History of measurement
 History of medicine
 History of transport
 Industrial history
 Military history
 List of battles
 List of wars
 Timeline of historic inventions

History of interdisciplinary fields 

 Classics
 History of ideas

Methods and tools
 Prosopography – a methodological tool for the collection of all known information about individuals within a given period
 Historical revisionism – traditionally used in a completely neutral sense to describe the work or ideas of a historian who has revised a previously accepted view of a particular topic
 Historiography – study of historical methodology

General concepts 
 Annals
 Big History
 Centuries
 Chronicle
 Chronology
 Decades
 Family history
 Future
 Future history
 Genealogy
 Historian
 Historical classification
 Historical revisionism – reinterpretation of orthodox views on evidence, motivations, and decision-making processes surrounding a historical event. Though the word revisionism is sometimes used in a negative way, constant revision of history is part of the normal scholarly process of writing history.
 Historical thinking – scholastic reasoning skills applied to historical content, including chronological thinking, historical comprehension, historical analysis and interpretation, historical research capabilities, and historical issues analysis and decision making.
 History is written by the victors
 History of science and technology
 Timeline of historic inventions
 Timeline of electromagnetism and classical optics
 Timeline of mathematics
 Timeline of atomic and subatomic physics
 Identity
 Intellectual history of time
 Landscape history
 List of time periods
 Marxist historiography
 Millennium
 Mythology
 Narrative
 Oral history
 Palaeography
 Past
 Periodization
 Political history
 Prehistory
 Present
 Pseudohistory
 Social history
 Social change
 Virtual history

Historians

 Herodotus 
 Dio Cassius 
 Livy 
 Appian 
 Jean Froissart 
 Georg Wilhelm Friedrich Hegel 
 Voltaire 
 Edward Gibbon 
 Thomas Macaulay 
 Alexis de Tocqueville 
 Arnold J. Toynbee 
 J. B. Bury 
 Will Durant 
 Samuel Eliot Morison 
 Francis Parkman

Lists

 Index of history articles
 Outline of archaeology
 Outline of classical studies
 Outline of medieval history
 Outline of the Renaissance
 List of historians
 List of timelines

References

Further reading
 Williams, H. S. (1907). The historians' history of the world. (ed., This is Book 1 of 25 Volumes; PDF version is available)
 Wells, H. G. (1921). The outline of history, being a plain history of life and mankind. (ed., This is Book 1 of multi-volume set.)

External links

 Internet History Sourcebooks Project See also Internet History Sourcebooks Project. Collections of public domain and copy-permitted historical texts presented cleanly (without advertising or excessive layout) for educational use.
 WWW-VL: History Central Catalogue first history on the WWW, located at European University Institute
 BBC History Site
 History of things provides quality historical information about countries, sports, brands, music and many other facts and stuff.

 History
History